Hin Channiroth (born 15 April 1990) is a Cambodian MC and actress. She is an MC on Bayon Television for a program called Cha Cha Cha and also a model for some magazines. Channiroth began her entertainment career when she was only 17.

Filmography

Film

Television show

Awards and honours
 2009: Freshie Girls & Boys (season 8) Winner
 2011: ASEAN TELEVISION CHARM
 2012: Anachak Dara: Most Popular Female MC

See also
 List of Khmer film actors

References

1. ហ៊ិន ចាន់នីរ័ត្ន ធ្វើការបកស្រាយជាលើកដំបូង ទាក់ទិននឹងរូបភាព ដែលអ្នកលេងហ្វេសប៊ុកយក មកចែកចាយ. Khmer Load. Retrieved 7 July 2016. 
2. ហ៊ិន ចាន់នីរ័ត្ន បញ្ជាក់ពីអវត្តមានលើវិស័យភាពយន្ត. Sabay News. Retrieved 20 March 2017.

External links
 Bayon TV - Cha Cha Cha
 Hin Channiroth on Facebook

Cambodian film actresses
Living people
1990 births
People from Phnom Penh